The International Cosmic Ray Conference, or ICRC, is a physics conference organized biennially by the Commission C4 (Astroparticle Physics)  of the International Union of Pure and Applied Physics (IUPAP) since 1947, where physicists from the whole world present the results of their research in Astroparticle Physics. The main topics of  Astroparticle Physics are

Cosmic Ray Physics, 
Gamma-Ray Astronomy, 
Neutrino Astronomy, 
Dark Matter Physics,
Multi-Messenger Astrophysics, 
Solar and Heliospheric Physics,
Astroparticle Physics Theory and Models,
Experimental Methods, Techniques and Instrumentation and
Outreach & Education in Astroparticle Physics.

As part of the opening ceremonies, The O'Ceallaigh Medal is presented to a researcher who has made distinguished contributions to Cosmic Ray Physics. Also, the Yodh Prize and the Bhabha Medal and Prizes are awarded to senior members of the community.

For young researchers, the Shakti Duggal Award and two IUPAP Young Scientist Awards are presented at each ICRCs.

Proceedings are published for each conference. Some are, partially or in full, available online (see external links).
The NASA's Astrophysics Data System (ADS) has started to gather these proceedings and publish them online on the ADS webserver.

List of ICRCs
 39th ICRC : 2025, Geneva, Switzerland 
 38th ICRC : 2023, Nagoya, Japan (webpage)
 37th ICRC : July 12–23, 2021, Berlin, online conference, Germany (webpage)
 36th ICRC : July 25 – August 1, 2019, Madison, Wisconsin, United States  (webpage)
 35th ICRC : July 12–20, 2017, Busan, South Korea (webpage)
 34th ICRC  : July 30 – August 6, 2015, The Hague, Netherlands (webpage) 
 33rd ICRC : July 2–9, 2013, Rio de Janeiro, Brazil (webpage)
 32nd ICRC : August 11–18, 2011, Beijing, China (webpage)
 31st ICRC : July 7–15, 2009, Łódź, Poland (webpage )
 30th ICRC : July 3–11, 2007, Merida, Yucatán, Mexico (webpage)
 29th ICRC : August 3–10, 2005, Pune, India (webpage)
 28th ICRC : July 31 – August 7, 2003 Tsukuba, Japan (webpage)
 27th ICRC : August 8–15, 2001, Hamburg, Germany (webpage)
 26th ICRC : 1999, Salt Lake City, United States
 25th ICRC : 1997, Durban, South Africa
 24th ICRC : 28 August – 8 September 1995, Rome, Italy (webpage)
 23rd ICRC : 1993, Calgary, Canada
 22nd ICRC : 1991, Dublin, Ireland
 21st ICRC : 1990, Adelaide, Australia
 20th ICRC : 1987, Moscow, USSR
 19th ICRC : 1985, La Jolla, United States
 18th ICRC : 1983, Bangalore, India
 17th ICRC : 1981, Paris, France
 16th ICRC : 1979, Kyoto, Japan
 15th ICRC : 1977, Plovdiv, Bulgaria
 14th ICRC : 1975, Munich, Germany
 13th ICRC : 1973, Denver, United States
 12th ICRC : 1971, Hobart, Australia
 11th ICRC : 1969, Budapest, Hungary
 10th ICRC : 1967, Calgary, Canada
 9th ICRC : 1965, London, United Kingdom
 8th ICRC : 1963, Jaipur, India
 7th ICRC : 1961, Kyoto, Japan
 6th ICRC : 1959, Moscow, USSR
 5th ICRC : 1957, Varenna, Italy
 4th ICRC : 1955, Guanajuato, Mexico
 3rd ICRC : 1953, Bagnères-de-Bigorre, France
 2nd ICRC : 1949, Como, Italy
 1st ICRC : 1947, Cracow, Poland

References

External links
 ICRC proceedings on the ADS website
 ICRC List on SPIRES
   Links to the online available proceedings
Physics conferences